Aram (full name: Azam Mirhabibi, ; born 1953) is an Iranian film actress. she began her career in Iran starring in the film Gorg-e bizar and went on to star in the film Aghaye jahel.

Her breakthrough role was in the 1978 film Hokm-e tir as Behjat.

Filmography

 Hokm-e tir
 Death in the Rain
 The Sleeping Lion
 Dust-Dwellers
 Koose-ye jonoob
 Gorg-e bizar
 Zabih
 Torkaman (1974)
 Aghaye jahel
 Sobh-e khakestar
 Gharatgaran
 Palang dar shab
 Hayoola
 Fryad-e eshgh
 Ranandeh ejbari
 Tirandaz
 Aloodeh
 Baba Khaldar
 Bezan berim dozdi
 Khoshgela Avazi Gereftin

References

External links
 

Living people
1953 births
People from Tehran
Actresses from Tehran
Iranian film actresses
Iranian television actresses
20th-century Iranian actresses